The 2021 Coca-Cola 600, the 62nd running of the event, was a NASCAR Cup Series race held at Charlotte Motor Speedway in Concord, North Carolina. Contested over 400 laps on the 1.5 mile (2.42 km) asphalt speedway, it was the 15th race of the 2021 NASCAR Cup Series season, as well as the third of the four crown jewel races.

Report

Background

The race was held at Charlotte Motor Speedway, located in Concord, North Carolina. The speedway complex includes a  quad-oval track that was utilized for the race, as well as a dragstrip and a dirt track. The speedway was built in 1959 by Bruton Smith and is considered the home track for NASCAR with many race teams based in the Charlotte metropolitan area. The track is owned and operated by Speedway Motorsports Inc. (SMI) with Marcus G. Smith serving as track president.

Similar to the Daytona 500, which was a four-stage race (with the first stage being the qualifying heat race), the Coca-Cola 600 is a four-stage race, with this the only race where all four stages are in the main race itself.  All four stages are scheduled to consist of 100 laps.  The race is official after the second stage.

Entry list
 (R) denotes rookie driver.
 (i) denotes driver who are ineligible for series driver points.

Practice

Practice results

Qualifying

Qualifying results

Race

Kyle Larson won the pole in qualifying. Larson dominated, leading the most laps and winning the first two stages. Kurt Busch had an issue that sent him to the garage, but when he returned to the race, he blew his engine. Several drivers had tire problems including Joey Logano, Kevin Harvick, and Martin Truex Jr. Larson won the third stage and pulled away from teammate Chase Elliott to over a ten-second lead to win his second race of the season, earning the 269th win for Hendrick Motorsports, making them the winningest team in NASCAR history.

Stage Results

Stage One
Laps: 100

Stage Two
Laps: 100

Stage Three
Laps: 100

Final Stage Results

Stage Four
Laps: 100

Race statistics
 Lead changes: 23 among 13 different drivers
 Cautions/Laps: 4 for 26
 Red flags: 0
 Time of race: 3 hours, 58 minutes and 45 seconds
 Average speed:

Media

Television
Fox Sports televised the race in the United States for the 21st consecutive year. Mike Joy was the lap-by-lap announcer, while three-time Coca-Cola 600 winner, Jeff Gordon and 2012 Fall Charlotte winner Clint Bowyer were the color commentators. Jamie Little, Regan Smith and Vince Welch reported from pit lane during the race. Larry McReynolds provided insight from the Fox Sports studio in Charlotte.

Radio
Radio coverage of the race was broadcast by the Performance Racing Network (PRN), and was simulcasted on Sirius XM NASCAR Radio. Doug Rice and Mark Garrow called the race in the booth when the field raced through the quad-oval. Rob Albright called the race from a billboard in turn 2 when the field was racing through turns 1 and 2 and halfway down the backstretch. Pat Patterson called the race from a billboard outside of turn 3 when the field raced through the other half of the backstretch and through turns 3 and 4. Brad Gillie, Brett McMillan and Wendy Venturini were the pit reporters during the broadcast.

Standings after the race

Drivers' Championship standings

Manufacturers' Championship standings

Note: Only the first 16 positions are included for the driver standings.
. – Driver has clinched a position in the NASCAR Cup Series playoffs.

References

Coca-Cola 600
Coca-Cola 600
Coca-Cola 600
NASCAR races at Charlotte Motor Speedway